1990 in the Philippines details events of note that happened in the Philippines in the year 1990.

Incumbents

 President: Corazon Aquino (PDP-Laban)
 Vice President: Salvador Laurel (UNIDO)
 Senate President: Jovito Salonga
 House Speaker: Ramon Mitra, Jr.
 Chief Justice: Marcelo Fernan
 Philippine Congress: 8th Congress of the Philippines

Events

January
 January 30 – Majority of voters in the Cordillera Administrative Region reject the creation of an autonomous entity in what would be the region's first referendum, as provided by the Organic Act (Republic Act No. 6766) that has approved the previous year, with Ifugao as the only province to vote for it.

February
 February 12 – General elections are held for the first time in the newly created Autonomous Region in Muslim Mindanao for the Regional Governor and Vice-Governor.
 February 27 – Sen. Juan Ponce Enrile is arrested regarding his involvement in the December 1989 coup attempt.

March
 March 4 – Hotel Delfino in Tuguegarao, Cagayan is seized by suspended Cagayan governor Rodolfo Aguinaldo commanding his private army estimated at 300 men. His suspension as governor in January 1990 and his subsequent indictment on charges of rebellion and murder were both related to his support for the Dec. 1-9, 1989 failed coup attempt against President Corazon Aquino. Brig. Gen. Oscar Florendo, sent by Aquino to serve Aguinaldo with an arrest warrant, was captured by Aguinaldo's men and later shot in the hotel, he died of his wounds. Hours of standoff ensued until nearly 1,000 government troops attacked the hotel to dislodge Aguinaldo's forces. In this siege at least a dozen others were killed in or around the hotel. Following the melee, Aguinaldo fled with about 90 fighters for mountains in the north.

April
 April 25 – Two U.P. Students, Ernesto "Cochise" Bernabe II and his girlfriend Anna Lourdes "Beebom" Castanos were abducted and killed in Pampanga. Their decomposing bodies are found on June 25–26.

May
 May 13 – Gunmen kill two United States Air Force airmen near Clark Air Base on the eve of talks between the Philippines and the United States over the future of American military bases in the Philippines.

June
 June – U.S. Peace Corps remove 261 volunteers from the country amid Communist threats.

July
 July 16 – An earthquake with a 7.8 Ms strikes Luzon. It kills around 2,000 and leaves damages of at least ₱10-billion, mainly from Metro Manila and regions in northern and central Luzon, especially Baguio, the most devastated, as well as Dagupan and Cabanatuan.

September
 September 28 – Sixteen military members are convicted and sentenced to life imprisonment regarding the 1983 assassination of Sen. Aquino.

October
 October 4–6 – Forces loyal to Col. Alexander Noble declare the independence of Mindanao and seize two military garrisons in Cagayan de Oro and Butuan. Noble forces were compromised by government forces and later turned himself in to the government in October 6.

November
 November 12 – Typhoon Ruping slams Visayas and affects Cebu City, Bacolod, and other key cities in the Visayas.
 November 16 – Autonomous Region in Muslim Mindanao is officially founded.

Holidays

As per Executive Order No. 292, chapter 7 section 26, the following are regular holidays and special days, approved on July 25, 1987. Note that in the list, holidays in bold are "regular holidays" and those in italics are "nationwide special days".

 January 1 – New Year's Day
 April 9 – Araw ng Kagitingan (Day of Valor)
 April 12 – Maundy Thursday
 April 13 – Good Friday
 May 1 – Labor Day
 June 12 – Independence Day 
 August 26 – National Heroes Day
 November 1 –  All Saints Day
 November 30 – Bonifacio Day
 December 25 – Christmas Day
 December 30 – Rizal Day
 December 31 – Last Day of the Year

In addition, several other places observe local holidays, such as the foundation of their town. These are also "special days."

Television

Sports
 September 22–October 7 – The Philippines participates in the 1990 Asian Games held in Beijing, China and it ranks 13th with one gold medal, two silver medals and seven bronze medals with an overall total of ten medals.

Births
 January 8 – Melissa Ricks, actress
 January 10 – Carla Jenina Lizardo, beauty queen and courtside reporter
 January 12 – RR Garcia, basketball player
 January 14 – Mikee Lee, actor, model and host
 February 1 – Ryan Buenafe, basketball player
 February 7 – Neil Etheridge, football player
 February 12 – Joana Houplin, football player
 February 13 – John Riel Casimero, boxer
 February 15 – Patrick Deyto, football player
 February 17:
 Michelle Gavagan, model, environmentalist, Miss Philippines Fire 2011
 Bea Rose Santiago, Miss International 2013
 February 27 – Megan Young, U.S.-born Filipina actress and Miss World 2013
 March 8 – Nico Salva, basketball player
 March 24 – Aljur Abrenica, actor 
 March 26 – Matteo Guidicelli, actor
 March 27 – Jake Ejercito, actor and model
 April 3 – Nico Ibaviosa, actor
 April 19:
 Kim Chiu, actress 
 Gretchen Ho, beach and indoor volleyball player and TV host
 April 27 – Jackie Rice, actress
 May 4 – Andrea Torres, TV/film actress and commercial model
 May 9:
 Harold Arboleda, basketball player
 Maxine Medina, designer, model, beauty pageant titleholder, actress and TV host
 May 31 – Justine Peña, host of O Shopping, commercial model and actress
 June 3 – Juneric Baloria, basketball player
 June 10 – Valeen Montenegro, actress
 June 12 – Eric Camson, basketball player
 June 19 – Jason Dy, singer
 June 25:
 Andi Eigenmann, actress 
 Chris Newsome, basketball player
 June 27 – Angelia Ong, model and beauty queen
 July 5 – Arron Villaflor, actor and model
 July 13:
 Chino Tan, actor and model
 Matt Ganuelas-Rosser, basketball player
 July 17 – Hiyasmin Neri, actress and host
 July 20 – Dominic Roque, actor and model
 July 23 – Young JV, singer-songwriter
 August 3 – Sophie Albert, actress
 August 10 – Gwen Zamora, Filipina actress
 August 12 – Enzo Pineda, actor
 August 19 – Debbie Gracia, actress and commercial model
 August 29 – Rizzini Alexis Gomez, 2012 Miss Tourism International titleholder (d. 2015)
 September 1 – Arianne Bautista, actress
 September 2 – Carl Guevara, actor and model
 September 16 – Nar Cabico, singer
 September 20 – Erich Gonzales, actress
 September 21 – Ivan Dorschner, actor
 September 27 – Charee Pineda, Filipino-American actress
 September 29 – Gerphil Flores, classical singer
 October 3 – Rhian Ramos, actress 
 October 11 – Jericho Cruz, Filipino basketball player of UAAP and PBA 
 November 9 – Robin Roño, basketball player
 November 16 – Arjo Atayde, actor
 November 20 – Rodney Brondial, basketball player 
 December 2 – Abra, rapper
 December 11 – Rome dela Rosa, basketball player
 December 30 – Rizza Diaz, courtside reporter

Deaths
 February 7 – Alfredo M. Santos, Chief of Staff of the Armed Forces of the Philippines (1962–65) (b. 1905)
 May 12 – Anastacio Caedo, Filipino sculptor (b. 1907)
 June 30 –  Miguel Cuenco, lawyer and politician (b. 1904)
 December 20 – Lauro Mumar, Olympic basketball player (b. 1924)

References

 
1990 in Southeast Asia
Philippines
1990s in the Philippines
Years of the 20th century in the Philippines